Intra fauces terrae is a Legal Latin phrase which translates as "In the jaws of the land". It is used to define the territorial waters.

External Reference 
 Legal Term Glossary

Latin legal terminology